Craig Township is one of six townships in Switzerland County, Indiana, United States. As of the 2010 census, its population was 900 and it contained 477 housing units.

History
Craig Township has the name of George Craig, a pioneer settler and afterward state legislator.

The Thiebaud Farmstead, Venoge Farmstead, and Thomas T. Wright House are listed on the National Register of Historic Places.

Geography

Unincorporated towns
 Braytown at 
 Five Points at 
 Lamb at 
 Long Run at 
(This list is based on USGS data and may include former settlements.)

Adjacent townships
 Pleasant Township (north)
 Jefferson Township (northeast)
 Milton Township, Jefferson County (west)

Cemeteries
The township contains these two cemeteries: McKay and Old Bethel.

Major highways
  Indiana State Road 56

Airports and landing strips
 Robinson Airport

School districts
 Switzerland County School Corporation

Political districts
 Indiana's 9th congressional district
 State House District 68
 State Senate District 45

References
 United States Census Bureau 2008 TIGER/Line Shapefiles
 United States Board on Geographic Names (GNIS)
 IndianaMap

External links
 Indiana Township Association
 United Township Association of Indiana

Townships in Switzerland County, Indiana
Townships in Indiana